Kampuchea Thmei Daily is a daily newspaper published in Cambodia. The papers headquarters are in Phnom Penh. The newspaper focuses on business and politics.

References

Khmer-language newspapers
Companies of Cambodia
Mass media in Phnom Penh
Publications with year of establishment missing